Trenton is a town in Pierce County, Wisconsin. The population was 1,737 at the time of the 2000 census. The unincorporated communities of Hager City, North Red Wing, Pucketville, and Trenton are located in the town. The unincorporated communities of Moeville and Snows Corner are also located partially in the town.

Geography
According to the United States Census Bureau, the town covers a total area of 30.2 square miles (78.1 km2). 28.1 square miles (72.8 km2) of it is land and 2.0 square miles (5.3 km2) of it (6.80%) is water.

Demographics
As of the census of 2000, there were 1,737 people, 647 households, and 500 families residing in the town. There were 671 housing units at an average density of 23.9 per square mile (9.2/km2). The racial makeup of the town was 98.79% White, 0.17% African American, 0.29% Native American, 0.12% Asian, 0.12% from other races, and 0.52% from two or more races. Hispanic or Latino of any race were 0.81% of the population.

There were 647 households, out of which 34.6% had children under the age of 18 living with them, 68.2% were married couples living together, 5.1% had a female householder with no husband present, and 22.6% were non-families. 15.9% of all households were made up of individuals, and 6.5% had someone living alone who was 65 years of age or older. The average household size was 2.68 and the average family size was 3.02.

In the town, the population was spread out, with 25.7% under the age of 18, 7.4% from 18 to 24, 31.5% from 25 to 44, 24.1% from 45 to 64, and 11.3% who were 65 years of age or older. The median age was 37 years. For every 100 females, there were 107.3 males. For every 100 females age 18 and over, there were 104.6 males.

The median income for a household in the town was $53,229, and the median income for a family was $58,224. Males had a median income of $37,028 versus $25,288 for females. The per capita income for the town was $23,634. About 3.5% of families and 5.6% of the population were below the poverty line, including 6.2% of those under age 18 and 3.8% of those age 65 or over.

Notable people
Clarence R. Magney, Minnesota Supreme Court justice
Walter C. Owen, Wisconsin Supreme Court justice

References

Towns in Pierce County, Wisconsin
Towns in Wisconsin